Best Group Video (最優秀グループビデオ賞)

Results
The following table displays the nominees and the winners in bold print with a yellow background.

2000s

2010s

2020s

See also
MTV Video Music Award for Best Group Video
MTV Europe Music Award for Best Group